Chief of Air Force (CAF) is the most senior appointment in the Royal Australian Air Force (RAAF), responsible to the Chief of the Defence Force (CDF) and the Secretary of the Department of Defence. The rank associated with the position is air marshal (three-star). The role encompasses "the delivery of aerospace capability, enhancing the Air Force's reputation and positioning the Air Force for the future". It does not include direction of air operations, which is the purview of the Air Commander Australia, a two-star position responsible directly to CDF in such circumstances but nominally reporting to CAF.

Between 1922 and 1997, the Air Force's senior officer was known as Chief of the Air Staff (CAS), a role akin to a chairman of the board. The Australian Air Board was collectively responsible for directing the RAAF, rather than the CAS personally. Wing Commander (later Air Marshal Sir) Richard Williams, often referred to as the "Father of the RAAF", was the first and longest-serving Chief of the Air Staff. In 1976 the Air Board was dissolved and CAS was invested with the individual responsibility for commanding the RAAF. The position of CAS became known as Chief of Air Force in 1997.

The Chief of Air Force may be selected from any of the RAAF's air vice-marshal appointments, although the Air Commander or Deputy Chief of Air Force are the most frequent appointees. While every chief to date has been a pilot, since the mid-1970s there has been no legal restriction on appointees from other disciplines. The CAF is appointed by the Prime Minister and is usually a fixed-term tenure, after which the member normally retires, unless offered the more senior role of CDF. Four heads of the RAAF have gone on to attain the position of CDF or equivalent.

History

1922–38: Williams and Goble

The position now known as Chief of Air Force had its beginnings in the years immediately following World War I. A permanent Air Board was instituted on 9 November 1920 to oversee the day-to-day running of a proposed Australian Air Force, which would succeed the extant Australian Air Corps that had itself succeeded the wartime Australian Flying Corps. On 31 March 1921, the Australian Air Force came into being, the "Royal" prefix being added five months later.

Wing Commander (later Air Marshal Sir) Richard Williams served as the first Chief of the Air Staff, commencing in 1922. The senior member of the Air Board, from April 1921 until October 1922 Williams was known as First Air Member, the fledgling Air Force initially not being deemed suitable for a Chief of Staff appointment equivalent to the Army and Navy.

Wing Commander (later Air Vice Marshal) Stanley Goble took over as CAS from Williams in December 1922, and over the next 17 years the two World War I veterans alternated in the position, an arrangement that "almost inevitably fostered an unproductive rivalry" according to RAAF historian Dr Alan Stephens. The Chief of the Air Staff position was intended to be "first among equals' on the Air Board, with decisions arrived at collectively and members able to submit dissenting reports to the Minister for Air if they wished, but Williams dominated the Board in the 1920s and 30s to such an extent that in 1939 Goble complained that his colleague appeared to consider the Air Force his personal command.

Cumulatively Williams served longer as CAS than any other officer, over 13 years, and is accorded much of the credit for maintaining the RAAF's position as an independent service in the face of attempts to turn it into a branch of either the Army or Navy. For this achievement, as much as for his involvement in its establishment, he is, in Stephens' words, "properly regarded as the 'father' of the Air Force".

1939–45: Crisis in command

The Williams-Goble duopoly ended in 1940. Williams was dismissed from his post in 1939 following publication of the Ellington Report, which criticised the level of air safety observed by the RAAF. Goble took over with the prospect of finally emerging from Williams' shadow but was concerned by, among other things, the emphasis he was required to place on the Empire Air Training Scheme (EATS), which promised to provide manpower for the air war in Europe at the expense of local defence. Goble refused to continue in the post and offered his resignation.

The Air Force expected Williams to be reappointed in Goble's place, but the United Australia Party government under Robert Menzies determined that a British officer should lead the RAAF rather than Williams or any emerging Australian senior officer. Following the temporary appointment of Air Commodore William Anderson (like Williams, a veteran of the Australian Flying Corps), the RAF's Air Chief Marshal Sir Charles Burnett became CAS in February 1940. Burnett proved to be a controversial figure with his record being described as "uninspiring and undistinguished" by his detractors, and as "formidable" by his supporters. During his time as CAS Burnett's prime focus was EATS but he also founded the Women's Auxiliary Australian Air Force (WAAAF) and RAAF health services, the latter having previously been provided by the Army.

The next CAS was a major surprise to the service and to the appointee himself. George Jones was only a substantive wing commander and acting air commodore when he succeeded to the role in 1942, leapfrogging several more senior officers including the Deputy Chief of the Air Staff, Air Vice Marshal William Bostock, a highly regarded commander who was expecting to take the position. Bostock was soon made head of RAAF Command, in charge of Australian air operations in the Pacific, while Jones' role was primarily administrative, to "raise, train and maintain" the service. Though Jones as CAS was nominally in charge of the RAAF, his new rank of Air Vice Marshal was the same as Bostock's and the command structure was not clear cut.

The situation led to a "disastrous" conflict at the top of the service, going far beyond the rivalry of Williams and Goble. Bostock was able to circumvent directives from Jones and the Air Board by appealing directly to Lieutenant General George Kenney, USAAF, Douglas MacArthur's chief of Pacific air operations. Jones in turn could curtail Bostock's supplies of manpower and equipment, as he did during the invasion of Tarakan in 1945 when he unilaterally grounded Australian bomber squadrons scheduled to take part in the attack. The Curtin Labor government did not act decisively to end the rift, its reaction being to again look to Britain for a suitable RAF officer senior to both men, though in the end nothing came of this. Kenney wrote that Jones and Bostock "fight each other harder than the Japs", but that he preferred their feuding to having a British officer in charge of the RAAF.

1946–75: Consolidation

Williams, Goble and Bostock were summarily retired in 1946. Jones, belatedly promoted to air marshal in 1948, oversaw the demobilisation of thousands of RAAF personnel and the creation of a peacetime service. The RAAF committed aircraft to the Malayan Emergency, on Jones' condition that the Air Officer Commanding all Commonwealth air force units would be from the RAAF. The British Air Ministry agreed and Air Vice Marshal Frederick Scherger took the post, regarded as a key stepping stone to his own eventual appointment as CAS. Jones also allocated No. 77 Squadron to Allied forces when the Korean War broke out in 1950.

Jones' ten years as CAS was the longest continuous term of any RAAF chief. When he was retired in 1952, the Menzies Liberal government again chose an RAF officer for the role, this time Air Marshal (later Air Chief Marshal) Sir James (Donald) Hardman. While the choice of a British officer caused resentment in the Air Force, Hardman was described by The Age newspaper as a "brilliant organiser", and changed the RAAF's structure from one based on geographical area to one based on function, leading to the creation of Home (operational), Maintenance (support), and Training Commands.

Hardman was succeeded in 1954 by Air Marshal Sir John McCauley, who expanded RAAF Darwin as Australia's major frontline base. The concept of shifting the Air Force's "centre of gravity" northwards was taken a step further by the next CAS, Air Marshal Sir Frederick Scherger, who proposed a series of "bare bases" across the north-west of Australia, beginning with the development of RAAF Tindal, south of Darwin (later to become a permanent base). Following his service as CAS, Scherger was appointed Chairman of the Chiefs of Staff Committee from 1961 to 1966, during which time he was promoted to Air Chief Marshal. He was the first RAAF officer to serve as Chairman of COSC, the Australian defence forces' senior position at the time, after an Army member and a Navy member. Air Marshal Sir Valston Hancock continued the policy of developing bare bases in Northern Australia, concentrating on RAAF Learmonth in Western Australia. He also recommended the General Dynamics F-111 as the aircraft best suited to replace the Canberra jet bomber as Australia's prime aerial strike platform.

The next CAS, Air Marshal Sir Alister Murdoch, began his term in 1966 and led the RAAF through the middle period of Australia's involvement in the Vietnam War. His initial refusal to commit newly purchased UH-1 Iroquois helicopters to the conflict for support of land forces has been blamed for fostering long-running enmity between the Air Force and the Army. Air Marshal Sir Colin Hannah commenced what was expected to be a three-year term as CAS in January 1970, but resigned early to become Governor of Queensland in March 1972, the first time an RAAF officer was appointed to a vice regal position. He was succeeded by his Deputy CAS, Air Marshal Sir Charles Read, whose tenure coincided with the long-delayed entry into service of the F-111C supersonic swing-wing bomber.

1976–present: A new role

Air Marshal Sir James Rowland was the first CAS to personally command the RAAF in a legal sense, following dissolution of the Air Board in 1976, a consequence of defence reorganisation in the wake of the 'Tange report' in 1973. A new Chief of the Air Staff Advisory Committee (CASAC) was set up, but there was no requirement for the CAS to accept its advice. At the same time, the stipulation for the appointee to be a member of the RAAF's General Duties (aircrew) Branch was removed. Rowland served from 1975 to 1979, going on to become Governor of New South Wales. His successor, Air Marshal (later Air Chief Marshal) Sir Neville McNamara would, from 1982 to 1984, be the first Air Force member to command all three services as Chief of the Defence Force Staff (CDFS), which had replaced the position of Chairman of COSC in 1976. Shortly after McNamara retired, CDFS was renamed Chief of the Defence Force (CDF).

Air Marshal David Evans played a major part in developing the RAAF's plans for the defence of Australia in the mid-1980s and beyond. The Air Force's role in shaping an overall strategy that exploited the "air-sea gap" was later acknowledged in the Federal Government paper "The Defence of Australia 1987". CAS from 1987 to 1992, Air Marshal Ray Funnell focused on turning the RAAF into the "air power element of a cohesive, integrated defence force". His service also saw the publication of The Air Power Manual, the RAAF's first self-produced treatise on aerial war fighting.

During the 1980s and 90s, conduct of air operations became the responsibility of the Air Commander Australia, a two-star rank, answerable direct to CDF in these circumstances but subordinate administratively to CAS. The operational authority of CAS thus decreased, its role once more becoming primarily to "raise, train and maintain" the Air Force. The relationship between the positions of CAS and Air Commander now resembled that between CAS and AOC RAAF Command during World War II, but the risk of another demarcation dispute such as arose between Jones and Bostock was mitigated by the overarching CDF role, which had not existed during the earlier conflict.

Air Marshal Les Fisher, who headed the RAAF from 1994 to 1998, served as the last CAS and the first Chief of Air Force (CAF), the change of name occurring in 1997. Fisher instituted a policy requiring staff to meet minimum physical fitness standards to remain in the service, for the first time in Air Force history. Air Marshal Errol McCormack commanded the RAAF as it moved into the 21st century, addressing fundamental cultural questions such as the balance of change and tradition, and whether defence should be run like a business. Beginning in 2000, he reintroduced the distinctive dark blue uniform that had been chosen by Richard Williams in the 1920s but discarded in 1972 by then-CAS, Air Marshal Hannah, in favour of a more neutral blue suit. McCormack's successor, Air Marshal Angus Houston, became well known to the public for contradicting the Federal Government's version of events in relation to the Children Overboard Affair. In 2005, Houston was promoted to Chief of the Defence Force, the third Air Force member out of 18 Chiefs of the Defence Force or equivalent, and the third to achieve the rank of air chief marshal.

Appointees
The following lists all chiefs of the RAAF, ranks and honours as at completion of their tours.

See also
 Structure of the RAAF
 Chief of the Air Staff (disambiguation)

Notes

References

External links
 RAAF Official Site (2008). Royal Australian Air Force leaders: Former Chiefs of the Air Force

Leadership of the Australian Defence Force
Royal Australian Air Force
Australia
 
 
Military appointments of Australia